André Previn and J. J. Johnson (subtitled Play Kurt Weill's Mack the Knife & Bilbao-Song and Other Music from The Threepenny Opera, Happy End, Mahagonny) is an album by pianist André Previn and trombonist J. J. Johnson performing Kurt Weill's compositions which was released on the Columbia label.

Reception

AllMusic awarded the album 3 stars.

Track listing
All compositions by Kurt Weill.
 "Bilbao Song" - 4:05 (from Happy End)
 "Barbara Song" - 6:07 (from The Threepenny Opera)
 "Overture" - 5:05 (from The Threepenny Opera)
 "Seeräuberjenny" - 4:20 (from The Threepenny Opera)
 "Mack the Knife (Moritat)" - 5:00
 "Surabaya Johnny" - 4:15 (from Happy End)
 "Wie man sich bettet" - 6:00 ("Meine Herren, meine Mutter prägte" from Rise and Fall of the City of Mahagonny)
 "Unzulänglichkeit"  - 4:55 (from The Threepenny Opera)

Personnel
André Previn – piano
J. J. Johnson – trombone
Red Mitchell – bass
Frank Capp – drums

References

1962 albums
Columbia Records albums
André Previn albums
J. J. Johnson albums
Kurt Weill tribute albums
Albums produced by Irving Townsend